Zhao Dan (June 27, 1915 – October 10, 1980) was a Chinese actor popular in the golden age of Chinese Cinema.

Biography
Zhao first became famous working in the Mingxing Film Company in the 1930s including playing opposite Zhou Xuan in Street Angel (1937). After the Sino-Japanese War, Zhao began a creative relationship with director Zheng Junli, with films such as the 1948 anti-Kuomintang drama-comedy, Crows and Sparrows.

Zhao remained on the mainland following the Communist victory in 1949 and continued to make films throughout the 1950s and 1960s notably in biographical films playing historical figures of Nie Er, Lin Zexu (both directed by Zheng Junli) and Li Shizhen.

Zhao joined Communist Party of China in 1957. During the Cultural Revolution, he was persecuted and imprisoned for 5 years. He died of pancreatic cancer in Beijing in 1980.

He was married to Ye Luqian in 1936. When he was arrested by Sheng Shicai in Xinjiang in 1939, it was rumored that he was killed. Thus Ye married the playwright Du Xuan. After the war, he was released and returned to Shanghai. He married actress Huang Zongying in 1948.

Selected filmography

As actor

As director

External links

A Man of Many Faces
Zhao Dan at the Chinese Movie Database

1915 births
1980 deaths
Male actors from Jiangsu
Film directors from Jiangsu
People from Yangzhou
Victims of the Cultural Revolution
20th-century Chinese male actors